The Malaysian Open Squash Championships is an annual squash tournament that takes place in Kuala Lumpur, Malaysia in July.  The event is organised by the Squash Racquets Association Of Malaysia and is the most prestigious squash tournament in Malaysia.  The event was established in 1975.

Past Results

Men's

Women's

See also
Kuala Lumpur Open Squash Championships

References

External links
malaysianopensquash.com - Official website
Squashsite.co.uk - website

Squash tournaments in Malaysia
Squash in Malaysia
Recurring sporting events established in 2010